Darko Pivaljević (born 18 February 1975) is a Serbian football manager and former player.

Playing career
Pivaljević appeared in seven games and scored two goals for Red Star Belgrade in the 1994–95 First League of FR Yugoslavia, as the team won the title. He subsequently played with Čukarički and Mladost Lučani, before moving abroad to Belgian First Division club Royal Antwerp in the 1997 summer transfer window.

After three prolific seasons at Antwerp, the last two of which were in the Belgian Second Division, Pivaljević secured a transfer to Bundesliga side 1. FC Köln in 2000. He, however, failed to make an impact with the German team and was loaned to Belgian First Division club Charleroi in November 2001. At the end of the season, Pivaljević terminated his contract with 1. FC Köln and signed with Rad in his homeland.

In 2003, Pivaljević moved back to Belgium and rejoined Royal Antwerp for one year. He subsequently spent three seasons with Cercle Brugge until 2007, before returning to Royal Antwerp once again. Later on, Pivaljević signed with Belgian Fourth Division club Cappellen in August 2011.

Managerial career
In the 2012–13 season, Pivaljević served as player-manager of Belgian Fourth Division club Merksem.

Honours
Red Star Belgrade
 First League of FR Yugoslavia: 1994–95

References

External links
 
 

1975 births
Living people
Sportspeople from Valjevo
Serbia and Montenegro footballers
Serbian footballers
Association football forwards
Red Star Belgrade footballers
FK Čukarički players
FK Mladost Lučani players
Royal Antwerp F.C. players
1. FC Köln players
R. Charleroi S.C. players
FK Rad players
Cercle Brugge K.S.V. players
Royal Cappellen F.C. players
First League of Serbia and Montenegro players
Belgian Pro League players
Challenger Pro League players
Bundesliga players
Serbia and Montenegro expatriate footballers
Serbian expatriate footballers
Expatriate footballers in Belgium
Expatriate footballers in Germany
Serbia and Montenegro expatriate sportspeople in Belgium
Serbia and Montenegro expatriate sportspeople in Germany
Serbian expatriate sportspeople in Belgium
Serbian football managers